The Djokovic–Murray rivalry is a modern-day tennis rivalry between Novak Djokovic and Andy Murray. They have met 36 times (including 19 finals), and Djokovic leads 25–11 overall and 11–8 in finals. Seven of these meetings have been in major finals: the 2011 Australian Open, which Djokovic won in straight sets; the 2012 US Open, where Murray defeated Djokovic in an almost five-hour long match to claim his maiden major title; the 2013 Australian Open, with Djokovic prevailing in four sets; the 2013 Wimbledon Championships, where Murray won in straight sets; the 2015 Australian Open and 2016 Australian Open, with Djokovic again prevailing in four and three sets, respectively; and the 2016 French Open, where Djokovic completed the career Grand Slam with a four-set victory.

Djokovic leads 5–1 in their matches on clay, Murray has won both of their matches on grass, and Djokovic leads on hard courts, 20–8. The rivalry began highly competitive and remained so for many years. However, since Murray won the 2013 Wimbledon Championships, Djokovic has taken a commanding lead, winning 14 of their last 17 encounters.

The two are almost the same age, Murray being a week older than Djokovic. They went to training camp together, and as juniors, Murray won the first match they played together. The rivalry has become an important part of both men's careers. Between May and August 2013 and between May 2016 and June 2017, they were the world No. 1 and 2 in ATP rankings; Djokovic held the top spot throughout the entire first period and the second period until November 2016, when Murray claimed it. They were the 2015 and 2016 year-end top 2 players in the world. They have not played each other for over six years (since January 2017 at the Qatar Open), mainly due to Murray's string of injuries.

Notable matches

2006 Madrid Masters round of 16
This was the first professional match between Djokovic and Murray, in the round of 16 at the 2006 Madrid Masters. This was the first of 20 matches at ATP Tour Masters 1000 tournaments the two would play, with Djokovic being the winner here in three sets.

2008 Cincinnati Masters final
The first tour-level final the two played came at the 2008 Western & Southern Open. This was Murray's first ATP 1000 final, and Djokovic's 6th. Murray beat Djokovic in straight sets, both in tiebreaks, to claim his first ATP World Tour Masters 1000 title.

2011 Australian Open final
Djokovic and Murray first met in a Grand Slam tournament at the final of the 2011 Australian Open. Djokovic beat Murray in straight sets to win his second Australian Open title in just over 2 and a half hours.

2011 Italian Open semi-final
Their second professional meeting on clay came at the 2011 Italian Open. Djokovic was dominant in the first set, breaking Murray three times and winning 6–1. Murray then held his serve and broke Djokovic to win the second set 6 games to 3. Djokovic then rallied to a 3 to 1 lead in the deciding set but Murray rallied back to serve for the match at 5 games to 4, giving him the chance to inflict Djokovic's first defeat of the year and to snap Djokovic's 38 match winning streak. However, two double faults from Murray allowed Djokovic to break back and win the match in a deciding tiebreak.

2012 Australian Open semi-final
Djokovic and Murray met each other in the semifinals of the 2012 Australian Open, in one of the longest and closest fought matches the two have ever played, at 4 hours and 50 minutes long. Murray took a two sets to one lead in the third set, before Djokovic came back in the last two, claiming victory in five sets. Djokovic later went on to defend his title against Rafael Nadal in another marathon match.

2012 US Open final

This was the second Grand Slam final the two played, and the first time the two had met at the US Open. After a 4-hour, 54 minute long final, Murray defeated Djokovic to claim his first ever major title, making him the first British man to win a Grand Slam title since Fred Perry in 1936. Murray claimed the first two sets, the first in a 24-minute tiebreak, and the second by 7 games to 5 after being 4–0 up at one point, before Djokovic levelled the scoring to take the match into a deciding fifth set, in which Murray regained his prior momentum and emerged victorious. This match equals the record set by Ivan Lendl and Mats Wilander as the longest US Open final in history, as well as the second longest major final in the Open Era, behind the 2012 Australian Open final earlier that year (which also featured Djokovic). It also featured the longest ever tie-break in a US Open final, with a 12–10 final score in the first set.

2012 Shanghai Masters final
Andy Murray was the two-time defending champion in Shanghai and was going for his third successive title, whilst Novak Djokovic had just won the China Open the previous week. Andy Murray took a close first set before the second set went to a tiebreak. Murray had five championship points but Djokovic saved them all to win the tiebreak 13–11, going on to win the final set and claim the title.

2013 Australian Open final
This was the second time (after 2011) Djokovic and Murray met in an Australian Open final. Djokovic was the two-time defending champion (having beaten Murray in 2011 and Nadal in 2012), while Murray looked to win his 2nd consecutive Grand Slam. Murray was coming off an exhausting five-set win over Roger Federer in the semifinals, while Djokovic breezed to an easy 89 minute, straight sets victory over David Ferrer. The first set was a tightly contested one. Djokovic had 5 break points, but failed to convert any of them, as Murray won the 1st set. Murray and Djokovic again went to a tiebreak in the next set, but Djokovic capitalized on a key double fault by Murray to win the 2nd set. The first two sets lasted a combined 2 hours and 13 minutes. From there, Djokovic took control and won in four sets, becoming the first man in the Open Era to win 3 straight Australian Open championships.  The trophy was presented by former Australian Open winner Andre Agassi, whose record of four Australian Open titles overall Djokovic had matched.

2013 Wimbledon final

Just 12 months after his loss to Roger Federer at the previous year's tournament, Murray made it through to his second consecutive final at Wimbledon, where he would face Djokovic in their fourth Grand Slam final. Murray fought back from a break down in both the second and third sets, winning the last 4 games of the match after being down by 4 games to 2. Leading by two sets and 5 games to 4 in the third, Murray raced into a 40–0 lead in the final game, gaining three championship points. However, not to be outdone, Djokovic fought back strongly, first to deuce, after which he held three separate break point opportunities. Murray saved each of these to claim the title, the first by any British man since Fred Perry in 1936. The victory meant Murray tied Djokovic at 2 wins each in Grand Slam finals, leading by 5 to 4 in their total finals head-to-head. In addition, the loss marked the first time in 80 Grand Slam matches that Djokovic had failed to win a set, his previous straight sets defeat coming against Tomas Berdych at Wimbledon in 2010. In the trophy ceremony immediately after the final, Murray said in his speech that the final game was "the toughest I've ever had to play in my career", and that his concentration was "so high" during the closing minutes of the match. Djokovic conceded that Murray was the better player on the day, and that he "absolutely deserved to win today".

2014 US Open quarterfinal
This was the second time the two met at the US Open. The first two sets were tightly contested and split between each, both in tiebreaks after Murray made comebacks when down 4 games to 1 in the first set and 3 games to 1 in the second set. However, Murray's fitness dropped in the third set with stiffness in his back and hips, allowing Djokovic to break Murray twice and take the third set 6 games to 2. Both players held their serve in the fourth set until Djokovic broke Murray's serve when leading 5 games to 4, winning the match in four sets and advancing onto the semifinals. This loss resulted in Murray dropping out of the top 10 for the first time since 2008.

2015 Australian Open final

This was the third time (after 2011 and 2013) that Djokovic and Murray met in an Australian Open final. Djokovic was the four-time champion (having won in 2008, 2011, 2012, 2013), while Murray had made his 4th Australian Open final. Djokovic was coming off an exhausting five-set win over Stanislas Wawrinka in the semifinals, while Murray beat Tomas Berdych in 4 sets. The first two sets were tightly contested. Djokovic took the first set in a tiebreak as a Murray backhand sailed long. In the second set, Murray made the push taking the set in a tiebreak, after failing to convert a set point earlier in the set. After Murray broke early in the third set, Djokovic would win twelve of the next thirteen games, including the last nine in a row, to take the match and the championship in four sets, becoming the first man in the Open era to win 5 Australian Open championships.  The trophy was presented to him by six-time Australian Open champion Roy Emerson, who held the then-record of Australian Open titles.

2015 French Open semi-final

This was their first meeting in the French Open. Djokovic had ended Rafael Nadal's run of 39 consecutive victories in the French Open with a straight sets victory while Murray came off a four set victory against David Ferrer. With Nadal and Roger Federer's quarterfinal defeats guaranteeing a first time champion at the tournament, both players each had winning streaks entering the match, Djokovic with an overall 27 match winning streak while Murray with a 15 match winning streak on Clay. Djokovic broke Murray's serve once to win the first set and then broke Murray twice in the second set for a two set to love lead. However, despite Djokovic having break points in the third set for a possible straight sets victory, Murray battled back and broke Djokovic's serve at 5 games all to win the third set on serve. After two breaks of serve in the fourth set, the match was suspended for the day at 3 games all due to an approaching thunderstorm. The match then resumed the following day and Murray again broke Djokovic's serve at 5  games all and closed the set on serve to take it into a fifth set. However, with the match being similar to their one in the 2012 US Open, Djokovic won the fifth set comfortably, winning 6 of the last 7 games to reach his third final in the French Open, ending Murray's winning streak on clay and denying him a place for his first French Open final. Djokovic would then lose the final to Stan Wawrinka in four sets.

2015 Canadian Open final
Djokovic headed into the Montreal final on an eight match winning streak against Murray, who had not beaten Djokovic since the 2013 Wimbledon final. Djokovic was seeking his fourth Canadian title (after 2007, 2011, 2012) with Murray looking for his third (after 2009 and 2010). The world No. 1 had also won the last 12 Masters finals in which he had competed, including wins at Indian Wells, Miami, Monte Carlo and Rome this year. Both players started strong, with Murray taking a lead, squandering it, and breaking back to win the set. Djokovic broke early to win set two. In the final set, Murray took an early lead which set up the pivotal fifth game. It lasted 15 minutes and had ten deuces, but Murray held on to extend his lead. Murray had three match points on Djokovic's serve but failed to convert, and he sealed the match on his own serve for a three set victory. This ended Djokovic's two year winning streak with Murray, who rose to world No. 2 again, overtaking Roger Federer.

2016: The battle for the world number one

Djokovic and Murray met five times in 2016 and created history by taking the battle for world number 1 to the final match of the season. Djokovic and Murray contested the finals at both the Madrid and Rome Masters in May; these were the first two times that they contested a final on clay. Both dethroned each other as the defending champion, with Djokovic defeating Murray in Madrid by way of a three-set win and Murray reversing the result in Rome with a straight-sets victory. By winning in Rome, Murray became the first player other than Djokovic or any Spanish player to win in the Italian capital since Andre Agassi in 2002, and the first British male champion since Pat Hughes in 1931. After losing to Djokovic in Madrid, Murray trailed him by 9,025 points. Murray then went on a 58-4 streak for the rest of the season, including a loss to Djokovic at the French Open final 3–6, 6–1, 6–2, 6–4 and who completed a Career Grand Slam. In addition, Djokovic also became the first man since 1969 to win 4 Grand Slam titles consecutively, completing the "Nole Slam". This was the first Major final since the 1984 French Open where the top 2 seeds met and neither had won the title yet.

Murray then went on to win two more Masters finals, three 500 series events and Wimbledon, plus a further Masters final appearance.

Djokovic and Murray met for the first time since the French Open final in the championship match of the season-concluding ATP World Tour Finals in London in November. Of the five meetings (all in championship matches) that took place between the pair in 2016, this one had added significance, as the winner would be the year-end world number one. The stakes were high in Djokovic's case, as a win would have seen him win his fifth overall year-end title, just one short of the overall record held by Roger Federer and Peter Sampras; Murray, on the other hand, was shooting for his first year-end title, having reached the championship match for the first time. Ultimately, Murray won in straight sets, becoming the first man other than Djokovic, Federer or Nadal to finish the year at the top of the rankings since Andy Roddick in 2003.

List of all matches

Singles (36)

Djokovic 25 – Murray 11

Records
 Only pair in the Open Era to contest four Australian Open finals.
 One of two male pairs in Open Era history to have met in each of the four Grand Slam finals (Djokovic–Nadal is the other pair).

Analysis

Head-to-head tallies
All matches: (36)   Djokovic, 25–11
All finals: Djokovic, 11–8
Grand Slam matches: Djokovic, 8–2
ATP World Tour Finals matches: Tied, 1–1
ATP World Tour Masters 1000 matches: Djokovic, 14–6
Olympic matches: Murray, 1–0
Best of 3 sets matches: Djokovic, 17–9
Best of 5 sets matches: Djokovic, 8–2
Matches lasting 5 sets: Djokovic, 2–1
Grand Slam finals: Djokovic, 5–2
ATP World Tour Masters 1000 finals: Tied, 5–5
ATP World Tour Finals finals: Murray, 1–0

Results on each court surface
Clay courts: Djokovic, 5–1
Hard courts: Djokovic, 20–8
Outdoor: Djokovic, 16–7
Indoor: Djokovic, 4–1
Grass courts: Murray, 2–0

Exhibition matches

Djokovic—Murray (3–0)

Performance timeline comparison (Grand Slam tournaments) 

 Bold = players met during this tournament

2005–2010

2011–2016

2017–Present

Djokovic–Murray Grand Slam tournament era (2008–present) 

*

Combined singles performance timeline (best result)

ATP rankings

Year-end ranking timeline

Career evolution

Novak Djokovic and Andy Murray were born one week apart (22 and 15 May 1987, respectively). Therefore, they have the same age at the end of a season.

 updated Monday 30 January 2023

See also
 Big Four
 Djokovic–Federer rivalry
 Djokovic–Nadal rivalry
 List of tennis rivalries
 Andy Murray career statistics
 Novak Djokovic career statistics

References

External links
Djokovic–Murray head-to-head
Novak and Andy The Rivalry

Tennis rivalries
Novak Djokovic
Andy Murray